Achada Lem is a settlement in the northcentral part of the island of Santiago, Cape Verde. In 2010 its population was 2,088. It is situated 6 km north of Assomada, on the road to Tarrafal (EN1-ST01). Its elevation is about 490 meters above sea level. Arlindo Gomes Furtado, now bishop and cardinal studied at the village's primary school.

References

Villages and settlements in Santiago, Cape Verde
Santa Catarina, Cape Verde